David John Lloyd (born 29 March 1943) is a former Welsh international rugby union player who captained the Wales team in 1972. He played club rugby for Bridgend, county rugby for Glamorgan and invitational rugby for the Barbarians. He later became head coach to the Wales national team from 1980 to 1982.

After his career in rugby, he became a P.E teacher at Ynysawdre and subsequently headteacher of Lower School of Ynysawdre. He then retired at the age of 65, in the Summer of 2005.

References

External links
Wales profile

1943 births
Living people
Barbarian F.C. players
Bridgend RFC players
Glamorgan County RFC players
People from Pontycymer
Rugby union players from Bridgend County Borough
Wales international rugby union players
Wales national rugby union team coaches
Wales rugby union captains
Welsh rugby union coaches
Welsh rugby union players